Only two essential fatty acids are known to be essential for humans: alpha-linolenic acid (an omega-3 fatty acid) and linoleic acid (an omega-6 fatty acid). The biological effects of the ω-3 and ω-6 fatty acids are mediated by their mutual interactions. Closely related, these fatty acids act as competing substrates for the same enzymes. The biological effects of the ω-3 and ω-6 fatty acids are largely mediated by essential fatty acid interactions. The proportion of omega-3 to omega-6 fatty acids in a diet may have metabolic consequences. Unlike omega-3 fatty acids and omega-6 fatty acids, omega-9 fatty acids are not classed as essential fatty acids because they can be created by the human body from monounsaturated and saturated fatty acids, and are therefore not essential in the diet.

Ratio of omega-6 to omega-3 fats in the diets of hunter-gatherers
It has been claimed that among hunter-gatherer populations, omega-6 fats and omega-3 fats are typically consumed in roughly a 1:1 ratio. At one extreme of the spectrum of hunter-gatherer diets, the Greenland Inuit, prior to the late Twentieth Century, consumed a diet in which omega-6s and omega-3s were consumed in a 1:2 ratio, thanks to a diet rich in cold-water fish (which are a rich source of omega-3s) and completely devoid of omega-6-rich seed oils.

Optimal ratio of omega-6 to omega-3 fats
To date, "no one knows what the optimal ratio in the diet is for these two families of fats." Science writer Susan Allport writes that the current ratio in Japan is associated with a very low incidence of heart and other diseases. A dietary ratio of 4:1 produces almost a 1:1 ratio of highly unsaturated fatty acids (HUFAs) in cell membranes."

In a study with rats, a dietary ratio of 4:1 showed significant favorable effects on learning performance and pain tolerance.

Andrew Stoll, M.D., Director of the Psycho-pharmacology Research Laboratory at Harvard's McLean Hospital, who advocates the consumption of the two fats in a 1:1 ratio, states, "Once in the body, omega-3 and omega-6 fatty acids follow parallel pathways, continually competing with each other for chemical conversion to various structures and molecules inside and outside the cells. Given this mechanism, it makes sense that the two fats might be required in approximately equal amounts."

Both Stoll and Allport assert that present-day diets in the developed world have departed dramatically from this ratio. It has been estimated that in developed countries, the ratio of omega-6s to omega-3s is closer to 15:1 Another estimate is that "[t]he diet consumed by the typical American tends to contain 14–25 times more omega-6 fatty acids than omega-3 fatty acids."

According to a 2009 review by the American Heart Association, instead of avoiding ω-6 fats, the ω-6:ω-3 ratio should be decreased by consuming more ω-3 fats. The conversion rate of linoleic acid (LA) into arachidonic acid is very low with a diet high in linolenic acid.

The maximum ω-6:ω-3 ratio allowed in dog food by the AAFCO is 30:1.

Fish

Nuts and seeds

See also
Monounsaturated fat
 For listings of particular classes of polyunsaturated fatty acids, see:
Polyunsaturated fatty acid
Polyunsaturated fat
Omega-3 fatty acid
Omega-6 fatty acid
Omega-9 fatty acid
Conjugated linoleic acid
Essential fatty acid – for biochemistry of most polyunsaturated fats
Essential fatty acid interactions – for the interactions between ω-6 and ω-3 fatty acids
Unsaturated fat
Israeli paradox

References

Fatty acids
Health-related lists